Édouard Barbazan (12 November 1902 – 25 December 1986) was a French athlete. He competed in the men's high jump at the 1924 Summer Olympics.

References

External links
 

1902 births
1986 deaths
Athletes (track and field) at the 1924 Summer Olympics
French male high jumpers
Olympic athletes of France
Place of birth missing